This is about an urban village in Delhi, India. For the Capital of Bangladesh, see Dhaka

Dhaka is an urban village in the North West district of Delhi, India, and is located near Kingsway Camp. It hosts 1500 houses and two chaupals and Park namely Prithvi Raj Chauhan Park. Much of the agricultural land in the village was acquired by the Delhi Development Authority post the partition of India to house migrants from Pakistan. These areas include Outram Line, Mukherjee Nagar, West Mukherjee Nagar, Bhai Parmanand Colony, Indira Vihar, Gandhi Vihar and Nehru Vihar. A large structure called the Pathar Wali Kothi, originally constructed by a Muslim family before the partition of India, stands in this small settlement. 

Delhi University is situated merely 1.5 km from Dhaka village. Its proximity to the university as well as to Mukherjee Nagar (a hub for IAS coaching classes) makes it a preferable location to rent student accommodation. Consequently, many single rooms are available to students in the area. Other notable places near the village include Harijan Sevak Sangh (Gandhi Ashram), Nirankari Sarovar, Batra Hall and Naini Lake in Model Town. The International Hostel for Girls opposite Indira Vihar is also located near Dhaka. The place is 10 mins walk from Guru Teg Bahadur (GTB) Nagar Metro Station and is primarily inhabited by people from the northern part of India mostly Chauhans (Rajputs).The area houses accommodation for students studying in DU and for IAS coaching classes.

Villages in North West Delhi district